{{Short description|''Battle of Tashkent was a successful battle of the Chagatai Khanate against Amir Timur}}

The Battle of Tashkent also known as the Battle of the Mire or The Battle of the Marshes''' was a battle between the Chagatai Khanate against Timur, and a rare defeat for Timur.

In 1365, the Mongols returned under the leadership of Haji Ilyas. Timur and Amir Hussein set out for Tashkent to meet this army. The battle ended inconclusively on the first day. On the second day, although Timur initially repelled the Mongols, Mongol General Semsheddin gathered a Mongol unit and defeated Timur without him realizing what had happened, suffering heavy losses. Amir Hussein's condition was not good. He was defeated and retreated. Seeing that Timur was also defeated, he realized that he had lost the battle and fled towards Samarkand. The Mongols came and besieged Samarkand, Timur's capital, neither Amir Hussein nor Timur faced the Mongols. Samarkand was left to its fate, and by their own efforts they defeated the Mongols.The battle was a decisive defeat for Timur and it was one of the three defeats he suffered in his life.

References

Works cited 

Battles involving the Timurid Empire
Tashkent